Colin Webster-Watson (6 May 1926, Palmerston North, New Zealand – 25 September 2007, Eastbourne) was a New Zealand sculptor and poet.

Webster-Watson (he hyphenated his name later in life) grew up in Palmerston North, where he attended Palmerston North Boys' High School. At the age of twenty, he traveled to Japan with the Commonwealth Occupation Force. While in Japan, his army superiors deemed that he would be better employed as an entertainer than a soldier, and gave him the responsibility to organise concerts for the troops.

In 1954, Webster-Watson moved to London to become a dancer and comedian at the Windmill Theatre. For a time, he also worked as a radio sports reporter in Wales.

Following the death of his father in 1960, Webster-Watson suffered a breakdown and moved to Italy. It was while running an orphanage in Alberobello that he discovered his love of sculpture and soon after established a studio in Rome. His patrons during this time included Gloria Swanson, Carroll Baker, Morris West, Robert Ardrey, Harold Robbins and Henry Rothschild. His work also graced the collection of Jacqueline Kennedy and Aristotle Onassis.

Webster-Watson married Jane Ewing in New York in the 1980s where they lived in Wainscott on Long Island.

In 1990, he moved to Palm Springs, California, where he lived until 2004 when he returned to New Zealand; he died in 2007.

Webster-Watson donated several works to Wellington including Tail of the Whale (Oriental Bay), Frenzy (Ōwhiro Bay), Prowling Cheetah (Wellington Zoo), Mountain of Dreams (Wellington Zoo), La Famiglia (Wellington Hospital).

References

Further reading
 Webster Watson, Colin (1997). Colin: Rome, Palm Springs. Colin Webster Watson. pp. 40.

External links
 Colin Webster-Watson on Flickr
 

1926 births
2007 deaths
People from Palmerston North
People educated at Palmerston North Boys' High School
Writers from Palm Springs, California
20th-century New Zealand sculptors
20th-century New Zealand male artists
21st-century New Zealand sculptors
21st-century New Zealand male artists